Isabel Cabanillas de la Torre (May 5, 1993 – January 18, 2020) was a Mexican artist, and activist with Mesa de Mujeres. She was also a member of Hijas de su Maquilera Madre an anti-capitalist feminist collective from Ciudad Juárez, with which she protested against femicides in the city. 

On January 18, 2020, she was killed in Ciudad Juárez. Protests were held throughout Mexico, in her name.

References 

1993 births
2020 deaths
Mexican women activists
Mexican women artists